The Greater Des Moines Botanical Garden (known as the Des Moines Botanical Center until 2013) is a  botanical garden located near downtown Des Moines, Iowa, United States, on the east bank of the Des Moines River and north of I-235.

History
Interest in a Des Moines botanical center began in 1929. A city greenhouse was acquired on the west side of the river in 1939, which served the city as a production and display greenhouse until the Botanical Center was completed in 1979. From 2004 to December 31, 2012, the facility was operated on behalf of the city by Des Moines Water Works. On January 2, 2013, the Greater Des Moines Botanical Garden opened for the first time as a nonprofit organization under the leadership of president and CEO Stephanie Jutila and the governance of the Greater Des Moines Botanical Garden Board of Directors. The institution is undergoing a dynamic renewal funded by a successful capital campaign to raise $12.6 million for the Phase I expansion of the outdoor gardens and improvements to the existing conservatory and building.

The conservatory has over a 1,200 different taxa from around the world in artistic settings designed to explore, explain and celebrate the majesty of the plant world. Future outdoor gardens, designed by the Chicago-based landscape architect Doug Hoerr, will include a new rose garden, entrance garden, nearly 0.5-acre water garden, maple allée, belvedere overlooking the Des Moines River, celebration lawn and walled perennial border, conifer and gravel garden, a hillside garden, and an annual and bulb parterre. These gardens reflect the institution's commitment to developing gardens as forms of public art.  The gardens will feature rich annual color designs conceived around artistic concepts inspired from music, history, art and pop culture, utilizing plants as the ingredients for exhibitions.

From the 1986 until the mid 2000s, the Botanical Center was a used as a Do It Yourself venue for the Des Moines Underground, Punk and Hardcore Music scene. Countless national touring acts such as Henry Rollins, Scream, Saint Vitus, Regional and Local bands played shows for all ages in the rental halls there. Often these bands and their fans had no other venue open to them in the area and for that reason the Botanical Center provided a much needed space for the music scene.

According to a contest on the WHO Radio Van & Bonnie morning show on June 21, 2011, the dome is constructed of 665 plexiglass panels.

In September 2020, CEO Stephanie Jutila resigned and was succeeded by Kim Perez in March 2021.

Dining and events
The Trellis Café open for lunch is located inside the Botanical Center with its entrance accessible under the dome through the gardens.

Various events occur at the Botanical Center including a summer concert series which starts in June.

March 2021 planned improvements
In March 2021, the Botanical Center revealed its plans for the development of an additional  which will include improved connections to both I-235 and the riverfront, an additional exterior entrance to the Trellis Café, a willow garden near the river with water and sand areas for children and families to enjoy, a River Cafe with edible fruit and vegetables planted nearby, restrooms, an amphitheater located in natural topography with a dry garden overlooking the amphitheater, and an elevated pathway through a canopy of trees in the rolling hills of the heavily wooded space.

Nearby recreational trails
Located between the Botanical Center and the Des Moines River in the greater Des Moines trails system, the Neil Smith Trail and the John Pat Dorian Trail connect just north of the Botanical Center along the eastside of the Des Moines River.

See also 
 List of botanical gardens in the United States

References

External links
 Des Moines Botanical Garden

Botanical gardens in Iowa
Geography of Des Moines, Iowa
Tourist attractions in Des Moines, Iowa
Greenhouses in Iowa
Protected areas of Polk County, Iowa
1979 establishments in Iowa